The 1844 Whig National Convention was a presidential nominating convention held on May 1, 1844 at Universalist Church in Baltimore, Maryland. It nominated the Whig Party's candidates for president and vice president in the 1844 election. The convention selected former Senator Henry Clay of Kentucky for president and former Senator Theodore Frelinghuysen of New Jersey for vice president.

While the Whigs had won the 1840 presidential election, the party needed a new ticket as President William Henry Harrison had died in April 1841 while his successor, John Tyler, had been expelled from the party in September 1841 for vetoing bills passed by the Whig-controlled Congress. The convention unanimously nominated Clay, a long-time party leader, for president. Frelinghuysen won the vice presidential nomination on the third ballot, defeating former Governor John Davis of Massachusetts and two other candidates. The Whig ticket went on to lose the 1844 general election to the Democratic ticket of James K. Polk and George M. Dallas.

Convention chairman 
Ambrose Spencer served as chairman of the convention, taking over from Arthur S. Hopkins, who was temporary chairman in the early stages of planning.

Presidential nomination 

President John Tyler had been expelled from the party and the delegates searched for a new nominee. President Tyler's break with the Whig Party, combined with Daniel Webster's decision to serve in the Tyler administration, positioned Clay as the leading contender for the Whig nomination in the 1844 presidential election. At the convention, Clay was nominated unanimously.

Platform 

Clay, a slaveholder, presided over a party in which its Southern wing was sufficiently committed to the national platform to put partisan loyalties above slavery expansionist proposals that might undermine its North-South alliance. The Whig party leadership was acutely aware that any proslavery legislation advanced by its southern wing would alienate its anti-slavery northern wing and cripple the party in the general election. In order to preserve their party, Whigs would need to stand squarely against acquiring a new slave state. As such, Whigs were content to restrict their 1844 campaign platform to less divisive issues such as internal improvements and national finance. Clay himself had previously stated that he was opposed to the annexation of Texas.

Vice presidential nomination 

Initially there were seven candidates for the Whig's vice-presidential nomination. They were:

 John M. Clayton, former Senator from Delaware and Chief Justice of the Delaware Superior Court.
 John Davis, former Senator and Governor of Massachusetts.
 George Evans, Senator from Maine.
 Millard Fillmore, former Representative from New York.
 Theodore Frelinghuysen, former Mayor of Newark and Chancellor of New York University.
 John McLean, Associate Justice of the Supreme Court.
 John Sergeant, former Representative from Pennsylvania.

Clayton, Evans, and McLean withdrew themselves from consideration before the first round of balloting had commenced. After three rounds of voting, Theodore Frelinghuysen – "the Christian Statesman" – was selected as Clay's running mate. An advocate of colonization of emancipated slaves, he was acceptable to southern Whigs as an opponent of the abolitionists. His pious reputation balanced Clay's image as a slave-holding, hard-drinking duelist.
Their party slogan was the bland "Hurray, Hurray, the Country's Risin' – Vote for Clay and Frelinghuysen!"

The Balloting

See also 
 List of Whig National Conventions
 U.S. presidential nomination convention
 1844 United States presidential election
 1844 Democratic National Convention

References

Further reading 
 Holt, Michael F. The Rise and Fall of the American Whig Party: Jacksonian Politics and the Onset of the Civil War (1999)

Primary sources 
 Chester, Edward W A guide to political platforms (1977) online
 Porter, Kirk H. and Donald Bruce Johnson, eds. National party platforms, 1840-1964 (1965) online 1840-1956

1844 United States presidential election
Whig National Conventions
Political conventions in Baltimore
1844 in Maryland
1844 conferences
May 1844 events